Jena  is an unincorporated community in Greene County, Alabama, United States.

History
Jena was most likely named by a German family who settled in the area in honor of Jena, Germany. A post office operated under the name Jena from 1837 to 1921. Baseball Country, a world-renowned baseball camp, is located in Jena.

References

Unincorporated communities in Greene County, Alabama
Unincorporated communities in Alabama